Tulu Calendar (also known as Varsa, Vorsa or Vodu, Tulu: ವೊರ್ಸೊ) is a traditional Indian solar calendar, generally used in the regions of Northern Parts of Kasaragod District of Kerala, and Dakshina Kannada, Udupi Districts of Karnataka, India. The indigenous or Tulu speaking people of Tulu Nadu, Tuluvas who migrated from this region to other places, are the common followers of this calendar system. The first day of this calendar falls on Bisu (middle of the Gregorian month of April). The first day of a Tulu Month is called as Thingade / Singade and the last day known as Sankrathi Day.

The 12 Tulu month names are:

 Paggu (April–May)
 Beshya  (May–June)
 Kaartel (June–July)
 Aati (July–August)
 Sona (August–September)
 Nirnaala/ Kanya (September–October)
 Bontyolu (October–November)
 Jaarde (November–December)
 Peraarde (December–January)
 Ponny/Puyinthel (January–February)
 Maayi (February–March)
 Suggi (March–April)

References

Culture of Karnataka
Culture of Mangalore
Tulu Nadu
Hindu calendar
Specific calendars
Time in India